The Astronomical League is an umbrella organization of amateur astronomy societies.  Currently their membership consists of over 280 organizations across the United States, along with a number of Members-at-Large, Patrons, and Supporting members. 

The mission of the Astronomical League is to promote the science of astronomy by (1) fostering astronomical education; (2) providing incentives for astronomical observation and research; and (3) assisting communication among amateur astronomical societies.

The Astronomical League provides a number of observing awards to members locating and describing certain specified astronomical objects or events, and produces a periodical publication, The Reflector.

History 
The beginning of the Astronomical League dates back to 1939 when members of eleven amateur astronomical societies met at the American Museum of Natural History in New York City. Similar meetings followed in Pittsburgh, 1940, Washington D.C., 1941, and Detroit, 1946. At the last meeting, final plans laid the foundation for a permanent organization constituting a nationwide federation of societies.
The next convention took place in Philadelphia, July 4, 1947, where the federation came into being with the adoption of bylaws was adopted, the election of officers, and the name "Astronomical League" was selected.  Shortly thereafter, the organization was incorporated as a non-profit organization. 

In 2003, The Astronomical League achieved the long-sought goal of a permanent, National Office. This provided a central location for communications, file storage, and general operations.  At the same time, the Astronomical League hired its first employee, an office manager. The National Office is located at 9201 Ward Parkway, Suite 100, Kansas City, MO 64114.

Awards 
Awards given by the league include the Leslie C. Peltier Award, the Jack Horkheimer Award, and the National Young Astronomer's Award.

Leslie C. Peltier Award
The Leslie C. Peltier Award is an annual award given by the Astronomical League to an amateur astronomer who has contributed observations of lasting significance. It was created in 1980 and was first awarded in 1981.

The award is named in honor of Leslie Peltier, an amateur astronomer from Delphos, Ohio, who was described by Harlow Shapley as "the world's greatest nonprofessional astronomer".

National Young Astronomer's Award
The National Young Astronomer Award is an award given by the Astronomical League to students of high-school age who have excelled in astronomical research.

Past Presidents
Harlow Shapley 	Interim (June-July 1947)
Edward Halbach 	1947-48
Helen Federer 	1948-49
Charles H. LeRoy 	1949-51
G. R. "Bob" Wright 	1951-52
Rolland LaPelle 	1952-54
James Karle 	1954-55
Grace Scholz 	1955-57
Russell C. Maag 	1957-58
Chandler Holton 	1958-60
Norm Dalke 	1960-62
Ralph Dakin 	1962-64
Arthur P. Smith, Jr. 	1964-66
Gene Tandy 	1966-68
William DuVall 	1968-70
W. C. Shewmon 	1970-72
G. R. "Bob" Wright 	1972-74
Robert Fried 	1974-75
Rollin P. VanZandt 	1975-77
Robert Fried 	1977-78
Robert Young 	1978-80
Orville Brettman 	1980-82
Jerry Sherlin 	1982-84
George Ellis 	1984-86
Jim Brown 	1986-88
Ken Willcox 	1988-90
James H. Fox 	1990-94
Barry B. Beaman 	1994-98
Charles E. Allen, III  1998-02
Robert L Gent 	2002-06
Terry Mann 	2006-10
Carroll Iorg 	2010-14
John J. Goss 	2014-2018
William "Bill" Bogardus  2018 (died in office)
Ron Kramer 2018-

See also

 List of astronomy awards
 List of astronomical societies

References

External links
 The Astronomical League
 The Astronomical League Page on the Meade 4M Community Website

Amateur astronomy organizations
Astronomy in the United States